Korovinskaya is a rural locality (a village) in Kalininskoye Rural Settlement, Totemsky  District, Vologda Oblast, Russia. The population was 15 as of 2002.

Geography 
Korovinskaya is located 27 km southwest of Totma (the district's administrative centre) by road. Levinskoye is the nearest rural locality.

References 

Rural localities in Totemsky District